The September 2019 Israeli legislative election was held using closed list proportional representation. Each party presented a list of candidates to the Central Elections Committee prior to the election.

Blue and White
The Blue and White list is headed by Benny Gantz and Yair Lapid; the list (up to the 30th slot) remains the same as in the April election.

Benny Gantz (Israel Resilience)
Yair Lapid (Yesh Atid) 
Moshe Ya'alon (Telem)
Gabi Ashkenazi (Israel Resilience)
Avi Nissenkorn (Israel Resilience)
Meir Cohen (Yesh Atid)
Miki Haimovich (Israel Resilience)
Ofer Shelah (Yesh Atid)
Yoaz Hendel (Telem)
Orna Barbivai (Yesh Atid)
Michael Biton (Israel Resilience)
Hili Tropper (Israel Resilience)
Yael German (Yesh Atid)
Zvi Hauser (Telem)
Orit Farkash-Hacohen (Israel Resilience)
Karin Elharar (Yesh Atid)
Meirav Cohen (Israel Resilience)
Yoel Razvozov (Yesh Atid)
Asaf Zamir (Israel Resilience)
Yizhar Shai (Israel Resilience)
Elazar Stern (Yesh Atid)
Mickey Levy (Yesh Atid)
Omer Yankelevich (Israel Resilience)
Pnina Tamano-Shata (Yesh Atid)
Gadeer Mreeh (Israel Resilience)
Ram Ben Barak (Yesh Atid)
Alon Shuster (Israel Resilience)
Yoav Segalovich (Yesh Atid)
Ram Shefa (Israel Resilience)
Boaz Toporovsky (Yesh Atid)
Orly Fruman (Telem)
Eitan Ginzburg (Israel Resilience)
Gadi Yevarkan (Telem)
Idan Roll (Yesh Atid)
Yorai Lahav-Hertzano (Yesh Atid)
Moshe Matalon (Telem)

Democratic Union
The Democratic Union list is headed by Nitzan Horowitz.

Nitzan Horowitz (Meretz)
Stav Shaffir (Green Movement)
Yair Golan (Israel Democratic Party)
Tamar Zandberg (Meretz)
Ilan Gilon (Meretz)
Issawi Frej (Meretz)
Yifat Bitton (Israel Democratic Party)
Yael Cohen Paran (Green Movement)
Noa Rotman (Israel Democratic Party)
Ehud Barak (Israel Democratic Party)
Gilad Kariv (Green Movement)
Mossi Raz (Meretz)
Michal Rozin (Meretz)
Yaya Fink (Israel Democratic Party)
Smadar Shmueli (Israel Democratic Party)

Joint List
The Joint List is headed by Ayman Odeh.

Ayman Odeh (Hadash)
Mtanes Shehadeh (Balad)
Ahmad Tibi (Ta'al)
Mansour Abbas (United Arab List)
Aida Touma-Suleiman (Hadash)
Walid Taha (United Arab List)
Ofer Cassif (Hadash)
Heba Yazbak (Balad)
Osama Saadi (Ta'al)
Yousef Jabareen (Hadash)
Said al-Harumi (United Arab List)
Jabar Asatra (Hadash)
Sami Abu Shehadeh (Balad)

Labor-Gesher
The Labor-Gesher list is headed by Amir Peretz.

Amir Peretz (Labor)
Orly Levy (Gesher)
Itzik Shmuli (Labor)
Merav Michaeli (Labor)
Omer Bar-Lev (Labor)
Revital Swid (Labor)
Hagai Reznik (Gesher) 
Eran Hermoni (Labor)
Saleh Saad (Labor)
Carmen Elmakiyes (Gesher)

Likud
The Likud list is headed by Prime Minister Benjamin Netanyahu.

Benjamin Netanyahu
Yuli Edelstein
Yisrael Katz
Gilad Erdan
Moshe Kahlon
Gideon Sa'ar
Miri Regev
Yariv Levin
Yoav Gallant
Nir Barkat
Gila Gamliel
Avi Dichter
Ze'ev Elkin
Haim Katz
Eli Cohen
Tzachi Hanegbi
Ofir Akunis
Yuval Steinitz
Tzipi Hotovely
Dudi Amsalem
Amir Ohana
Ofir Katz
Eti Atiya
Yoav Kish
David Bitan
Keren Barak
Shlomo Karhi
Miki Zohar
Yifat Shasha-Biton
Sharren Haskel
Michal Shir
Keti Shitrit
Fateen Mulla
May Golan
Tali Ploskov
Uzi Dayan
Ariel Kellner
Osnat Mark

Otzma Yehudit
The Otzma Yehudit list is headed by Itamar Ben-Gvir. Baruch Marzel and Ben-Zion Gopstein were barred from running on 25 August 2019 by the Supreme Court of Israel.

Itamar Ben-Gvir
Adva Biton
Yitzchak Wasserlauf
David Cooperschmidt

Shas
The Shas list is headed by Minister of the Interior Aryeh Deri.

Aryeh Deri
Yitzhak Cohen
Meshulam Nahari
Ya'akov Margi
Yoav Ben-Tzur
Michael Malchieli
Moshe Arbel
Yinon Azulai
Moshe Abutbul

United Torah Judaism
The United Torah Judaism list represents the Agudat Yisrael and Degel HaTorah parties, which have run jointly since 1992. The list is headed by Yaakov Litzman, and is identical to the April 2019 list.

Yaakov Litzman (Agudat Yisrael)
Moshe Gafni (Degel HaTorah)
Meir Porush (Agudat Yisrael)
Uri Maklev (Degel HaTorah)
Ya'akov Tessler (Agudat Yisrael)
Ya'akov Asher (Degel HaTorah)
Yisrael Eichler (Agudat Yisrael)
Yitzhak Pindros (Degel HaTorah)

Yamina
The Yamina list is headed by Ayelet Shaked. It is an alliance of the New Right and the Union of the Right-Wing Parties (URWP).

Ayelet Shaked (New Right)
Rafi Peretz (Jewish Home)
Bezalel Smotrich (National Union–Tkuma)
Naftali Bennett (New Right)
Moti Yogev (Jewish Home)
Ofir Sofer (National Union–Tkuma)
Matan Kahana (New Right)
Idit Silman (Jewish Home)
Roni Sassover (New Right)
Orit Strook (National Union–Tkuma)
Shai Maimon (New Right)
Shuli Mualem (New Right)
Eli Ben-Dahan (Jewish Home)

Yisrael Beitenu
The Yisrael Beitenu list is headed by Avigdor Lieberman.

Avigdor Lieberman
Oded Forer
Evgeny Sova
Eli Avidar
Yulia Malinovsky
Hamad Amar
Alex Kushnir
Mark Ifraimov
Limor Magen Telem
Elina Bardach-Yalov

Zehut (withdrawn)
The Zehut list was headed by Moshe Feiglin, though Feiglin announced on 29 August that it would pull out of the race in return for a ministerial position and a push for the legalization of medical cannabis, pending a ratification of the agreement by Zehut members, which was approved on 1 September. On 3 September, the entire Zehut list withdrew from the elections, effectively eliminating the party's candidacy.

Moshe Feiglin
Gilad Alper
Ronit Dror
Arkady Muter

Minor parties
Minor parties in the order in which they registered with the Central Elections Committee.

The Da'am: Green Economy – One State  (דעם - כלכלה ירוקה מדינה אחת)
Social Leadership (מנהיגות חברתית)
Economic Power (עוצמה כלכלית קולם של העסקים בישראל)
Zechuyoteinu Bekoleinu ("Our Rights Are in Our Vote/Voice") (זכויותנו בקולנו - לחיים בכבוד)
Uncorrupted Red White (אדום לבן - לגליזציה לקנביס, שוויון לאתיופים, ערבים ומקופחים)
Pirate Party (הפיראטים - כי כולנו באותה סירה והכל אותו שייט)
Mitkademet (מתקדמת)
The Gush Hatanachi (Bible Bloc) (מפלגת הגוש התנ"כי)
Justice, headed by Avi Yalou (צדק בראשות אבי ילאו)
Kama (קמ"ה - קידום מעמד הפרט)
Kavod HaAdam (כבוד האדם)
Respect and Equality (כבוד ושוויון)
Democracy Party (מפלגת הדמוקראטורה)
Noam (נעם - עם נורמלי בארצנו)
Israel Brothers for Social Justice (כל ישראל אחים לשוויון חברתי)
Seder Hadash (סדר חדש - לשינוי שיטת הבחירות)
Popular Unity (האחדות העממית - אלוחדה אלשעביה בראשות פרופ' אסעד גאנם)
Tzomet (צומת - התיישבות וחקלאות)
Liberal Christian Movement (התנועה הנוצרית הליברלית)
Secular Right (רון קובי - הימין החילוני נלחמים בכפייה החרדית)
Tzafon (צפון)

References

2019 2

he:הבחירות לכנסת העשרים ושתיים#היערכות המפלגות ויצירת הרשימות